Baek Mi-kyung (born 1971) is a South Korean television and film screenwriter. A star writer who has written many well-received dramas, such as Strong Girl Bong-soon (JTBC, 2017) and The Lady in Dignity (JTBC, 2017). The Lady in Dignity held the record of being JTBC's highest-rated drama for one and a half years, until it was overtaken by Sky Castle in 2018.

Filmography

Television series

Film
Heung-boo: The Revolutionist (2017)

References

External links
 
 

Living people
1971 births
South Korean screenwriters
South Korean television writers